Muthuvan is a tribal Dravidian language related to Tamil, mainly spoken in the Pooyamkutty-Idamalayar Dam region in Ernakulam district of Kerala by the Muthuvan people.

References

Tamil languages